De Soto is a city in Sumter County, Georgia, United States. The population was 214 at the 2000 census. It is part of the Americus Micropolitan Statistical Area.

History
The Georgia General Assembly incorporated the place in 1889 as the "Town of De Soto". The community is named for Hernando de Soto, the explorer who discovered the Mississippi River.

Geography
De Soto is located at  (31.954674, -84.067633).

Demographics

As of the census of 2000, there were 214 people, 78 households, and 53 families residing in the city. The racial makeup of the city was 33.18% White, 65.89% African American and 0.93% Native American. Hispanic or Latino of any race were 1.87% of the population.

There were 78 households, out of which 24.4% had children under the age of 18 living with them, 50.0% were married couples living together, 15.4% had a female householder with no husband present, and 30.8% were non-families. 26.9% of all households were made up of individuals, and 14.1% had someone living alone who was 65 years of age or older. The average household size was 2.74 and the average family size was 3.35.

In the city, the population was spread out, with 22.9% under the age of 18, 8.4% from 18 to 24, 29.0% from 25 to 44, 22.0% from 45 to 64, and 17.8% who were 65 years of age or older. The median age was 40 years. For every 100 females, there were 103.8 males. For every 100 females age 18 and over, there were 94.1 males.

The median income for a household in the city was $20,375, and the median income for a family was $37,500. Males had a median income of $19,000 versus $15,714 for females. The per capita income for the city was $11,388. About 1.8% of families and 12.2% of the population were below the poverty line, including 4.8% of those under the age of eighteen and 8.5% of those 65 or over.

Politics
In 2010, the city was cited by the Georgia Secretary of State's office for failing to hold regular elections in 2009, as well as being unable to document any elections from 2005 through 2007.  A De Soto councilmember apologized by saying that the city simply "forgot" about the need to hold an election.  Facing a number of state violations, the city promised to remedy the situation permanently by outsourcing the elections process to a third party. The state provided that the 2009 election must be held by March 2010.

References

Cities in Georgia (U.S. state)
Cities in Sumter County, Georgia
Americus, Georgia micropolitan area